The Wills Women's Match Play was a women's amateur match-play event. It was held from 1967 to 1974. Finals were over 36 holes except for 1974, which was played over 18 holes, with the semi-finals played in the morning. The event was sponsored by W.D. & H.O. Wills.

Winners

References

Amateur golf tournaments in the United Kingdom
Women's golf in the United Kingdom
1967 establishments in England
1974 disestablishments in England
Recurring sporting events established in 1967
Recurring sporting events disestablished in 1974